Richard H. Boutwell is a United States Air Force brigadier general who had served as the vice commander of the Fifteenth Air Force. He previously commanded the 321st Air Expeditionary Wing.

References

External links

Barry Cornish

Year of birth missing (living people)
Living people
Place of birth missing (living people)
United States Air Force generals
Date of birth missing (living people)